Ralgex Spray is a spray designed to soothe painful muscles and joints in humans when applied to the skin. There is also Ralgex cream available which is used for the same purpose. It is manufactured by GlaxoSmithKline.

Ingredients
Active Ingredients (% w/w) (applies for Ralgex cream 40g):

Glycol Monosalicylate 10.00%
Methyl Nicotinate BP 1.00%
Capsicum Oleoresin BPC 0.12%

Inactive Ingredients:
emulsifying wax
glycerol monostearate and polyoxyethylene sterate
oleyl alcohol
methyl and butyl hydroxybenzoate
perfumes and water

GSK plc brands